Corinne Gallant  (1922 – 24 July 2018) was a Canadian professor emeritus and feminist. She held the office of Vice-Dean of the Faculty of Arts and director of the philosophy program at the Université de Moncton. As a feminist leader, she co-chaired a working committee that led to the creation of the New Brunswick Advisory Council on the Status of Women and chaired the Canadian Research Institute for the Advancement of Women. She was made a member of the Order of Canada in 1988 and received the Order of Moncton in 2012.

Biography 

Gallant was born in Moncton, New Brunswick, Canada, in 1922. She was a member of the Sisters of Our Lady of the Sacred Heart for 26 years before becoming a lay person in 1970. One of the first Acadian women to earn a doctorate, Gallant taught philosophy at the Université de Moncton for many years and became director of the philosophy program and Vice-Dean of the Faculty of Arts.

Gallant has made many commitments to the advancement of women.  She created one of the first women's courses in Canada. Eighty women from this evening class continued meeting and in 1968 formed Moncton's first feminist group, La Fédération des dames d'Acadie. Gallant supported the 1973 foundation of a provincial organization to promote women's causes. She was a board member of Crossroad for Women, a shelter for women and children fleeing abuse, from 1985 to 1988. In 1989, she co-chaired a working committee that led to the creation of the New Brunswick Advisory Council on the Status of Women and remained an active member until 1994. Gallant also chaired the Canadian Research Institute for the Advancement of Women (CRIAW). She retired in 1994.

Gallant was made a member of the Order of Canada in 1988 and received the Queen's Golden Jubilee Medal. Gallant was made a professor emeritus at the University of Moncton and received the Order of Moncton.  She also received the 2012 Governor General's Award for the advancement of women's equality.

At the end of 2012, in celebration of the 50th anniversary of the University of Moncton, Simone LeBlanc-Rainville released the book Corinne Gallant: A Pioneer of Feminism in Acadia as the first volume of the "Mémoire biographique" collection of the Institut d'études acadiennes. The collection honours Acadians who have contributed to the development of their society.

Gallant died at CHU Dumont hospital in Moncton on 24 July 2018.

Awards and honours 
125th Anniversary of the Confederation of Canada Medal
Member of the Order of Canada, 1988
Queen's Golden Jubilee Medal, 2002
Order of Moncton, 2012
Governor General's Award for the advancement of women's equality, 2012
New Brunswick Human Rights Award, 2014

References 

1922 births
2018 deaths
Acadian people
Members of the Order of Canada
Academic staff of the Université de Moncton
Canadian people of Acadian descent
People from Dieppe, New Brunswick
Canadian feminists
20th-century Canadian women
21st-century Canadian women
Date of birth missing
Governor General's Award in Commemoration of the Persons Case winners